Route 334 is a collector road in the Canadian province of Nova Scotia.

It is located in Yarmouth County and connects Arcadia at Trunk 3 with Lower Wedgeport.

Communities
 Lower Wedgeport
 Wedgeport
 Upper Wedgeport
 Plymouth
 Arcadia

History
 
The entirety of Collector Highway 334 was once designated as Trunk Highway 34.

See also
List of Nova Scotia provincial highways

References

Nova Scotia provincial highways
Roads in Yarmouth County